This is a list of Sri Lankan Canadians, including both original immigrants who obtained Canadian citizenship and their Canadian descendants, but not Sri Lankan nationals living or working in Canada. The list includes a brief description of their reason for notability.

Academics
 Soharn Randy Boyagoda - Principal of University of St. Michael's College, Toronto, writer 
 Chandre Dharma-wardana - principal research scientist at the National Research Council of Canada
 Elagu V. Elaguppillai - businessman, nuclear scientist, university professor, medical researcher
 Ray Jayawardhana - astronomer at the University of Toronto
 Lakshman Marasinghe - academic and lawyer
 Janaka Ruwanpura - Director of the Centre for Project Management Excellence at the Schulich School of Engineering at University of Calgary
 Indira Samarasekera - President and 12th Vice-Chancellor of the University of Alberta

Activists
 Cheryl Perera - children's rights activist, founder of OneChild

Business
 Christopher Ondaatje - former athlete and philanthropist
 Chamath Palihapitiya - venture capitalist, software developer

Film and entertainment
 Rohan Fernando - visual artist, painter and filmmaker
 Rasanga Weerasinghe - filmmaker, artist
 Suresh Joachim - actor, producer and multiple Guinness World Record holder
 Pardis Parker - director, writer, actor, and comedian
 Lenin M. Sivam - filmmaker
 Rajiv Surendra - actor
 Maitreyi Ramakrishnan - actress

Journalists
 D. B. S. Jeyaraj - freelance journalist
 Anne-Marie Mediwake - news anchor

Musicians
 Nirmala Basnayake - musician in the band controller.controller

Politics and law
 Gary Anandasangaree - Canadian Member of Parliament for Scarborough—Rouge Park
 Logan Kanapathi - Markham City Councillor for Ward 7
 Rathika Sitsabaiesan - former Canadian Member of Parliament for Scarborough-Rouge River
 Asoka Weerasinghe - former Deputy High Commissioner for Sri Lanka in Canada

Rebels
 Kumaravelu Vignarajah - LTTE cadre

Sports people
 Trevin Bastiampillai - Canadian cricketer
 Manoj David - Canadian cricketer
 Ruvindu Gunasekera - Canadian cricketer
 Rohan Jayasekera - Sri Lankan and Canadian cricketer
 Arvind Kandappah - Canadian cricketer
 Ravishankar Puvendran - Canadian cricketer
 Sanjayan Thuraisingam - Canadian cricketer
 Zameer Zahir - Canadian cricketer

Writers
 Rienzi Crusz - Poet
 Siri Gunasinghe - Sinhalese poet, novelist, literary critic
 Michael Ondaatje - poet and author of numerous novels, including The English Patient
 Leah Lakshmi Piepzna-Samarasinha - poet, writer, educator and social activist
 Shyam Selvadurai - novelist

See also
 List of Sri Lankans

References

List
ca
Sri Lankan
Sri Lankan